Stanley Keleman (November 1931 – August 11, 2018) was an American writer and therapist, who created the body psychotherapy approach known as "formative psychology". He was one of the leaders of the body psychotherapy movement nationally and internationally.  His methodology rested on an anatomical base and incorporates an evolutionary, philosophical and mythological perspective; within this formative paradigm the human is capable of learning voluntary self-influence of instinctual and emotional expression as a way to manage dilemmas of daily living and to form personal choices for creating a future.  Keleman started developing and articulating his concepts in 1957. In 1971, he published the first of 10 books.

Early life
Keleman was born in Brooklyn in 1931, the son of Jewish immigrants from Hungary and Romania. He graduated from the Chiropractic Institute of New York in 1954.

Career

Early career and mentorships
During his early years as a chiropractic clinician, starting in 1955 he focused on stress reduction and began to observe the relationship between emotional conflict, organismic movement and distortions of body posture.

This education balanced the characterological approaches of Lowen, Freud, and Reich.  He also started leading emotional expressive classes at this time to explore the relationship between movement patterns and psychological expression.

At this same time, he began a personal mentorship with Nina Bull, of, Columbia University, and author of The Attitude Theory of Emotion. He joined with her on a research project which resulted in her book, The Body and Its Mind. This work  became the driving force that transformed Keleman's chiropractic orientation from postural distortion to postural reorganization and profoundly influenced the direction of his work. In working with her on her research he came to see how physical actions are at the base of the emotional organization of a person and not the other way around.  Action precedes emotion and is its creator; action is not the result of emotion.

In the early 1960s, he studied Daisen Analysis in Zurich with Dori Gutscher, in the school of Medard Boss, and in Germany with Professor Karlfried Graf Durckheim, at the Center for Initiation Studies. Durckheim offered an approach that used the human form to reveal the relationship of man to his own nature and to nature in general. From these experiences Keleman evolved from an instinctual and social emphasis, adding a phenomenological and existential orientation which he felt was a missing philosophical perspective.

These workshops evolved into the annual programs taught by Keleman in Berkeley and Solingen, Germany, that connect dreams, body and the formative process.

Later career
 Somatic-emotional education at the Center uses individual experience, emotions, action patterns, insights, and images to discover how life has been shaped and what is seeking to emerge. The focus is on learning to use the cortex and muscles to voluntarily generate experiences to grow oneself and to create a personal skill for managing one's life, in one's own way.

Beginning in the early 1990s, Keleman developed his work with an emphasis on education rather than therapy. He has applied ideas from Darwin's theory of evolution and Einstein's theory of mass and energy to understanding how shapes change over time and how the individual can learn to influence the body that nature has given us.  Along with his vision and philosophy of Formative Psychology, he has developed an original methodology for teaching individuals how to participate in their own formative process. His focus is on how the body shapes itself over time, through all of life's stages, as part of an ongoing process of voluntarily forming a future and a personal self.

Keleman has given public seminars on Formative Psychology at Spectrum Therapy in London, England. Spectrum is a member of the international formative psychology community and its professional supervision and study program. Additional centers where Keleman's Formative Psychology approach provides the basis of both clinical work and education are Practice for Somatic Education and Therapy in Groningen, The Netherlands  and the Institute for Stress Management in Mainz, Germany.

Awards and honors
He was the recipient of Lifetime Achievement Awards from the USA Association of Body Psychotherapy June 2005  and the European Association for Body Psychotherapy in Berlin in September 2007.   He received an Honorary Ph.D. from Saybrook University in San Francisco in June 2007 for his contributions to the field of Body Psychotherapy and Humanistic Psychology.

Keleman is the Honorary President and Director of Research at the Zurich School for Form and Movement in Zurich, Switzerland, the Brazilian Center of Formative Psychology in Rio de Janeiro, Brazil, and at the Institute for Formative Psychology in Solingen, Germany  where he also teaches.

Bibliography 
 Keleman, Stanley (1999).  Myth & The Body: A Colloquy with Joseph Campbell]. Berkeley, CA: Center Press. . In 1973, Stanley Keleman and Joseph Campbell began to hold what would be fourteen annual seminars, to trade their thoughts on the subject of mythology and the body.  Myth & the Body is based largely on the transcriptions from these years of taped seminars. Campbell and Keleman shared the belief that myths describe the experiences of the body and, in fact, are metaphors for internal body states.
 Keleman, Stanley (1994). Love: A Somatic View Berkeley, CA: Center Press. . 
 Keleman, Stanley (1989).Patterns of Distress: Emotional Insults and Human Form. Berkeley, CA: Center Press. . 
 Keleman, Stanley (1996). Bonding: A Somatic Emotional Approach to Transference  Berkeley, CA: Center Press. . 
 Keleman, Stanley (1987). Embodying Experience: Forming a Personal Life Berkeley, CA: Center Press. .
 Keleman, Stanley (1985). Emotional Anatomy   Berkeley, CA: Center Press. .
 Keleman, Stanley (1983)  'In Defense of Heterosexuality  Berkeley, CA: Center Press.     The book is a discussion of how of heterosexuality  performs the function of bringing man and woman together, to perpetuate life and to foster shared experience and the caring, contactful dialogues that help humans grow as gendered persons.
 Keleman, Stanley (1979).  Somatic Reality.  Berkeley, CA: Center Press. .  Transitions--crises, changes and turning points--are part of each human life and they include bodily transitions and experience. This book discusses how life changes are expressed somatically.
 Keleman, Stanley (1981).  Your Body Speaks Its Mind   Berkeley, CA: Center Press. .• Illustrating Keleman's use of the body's emotional language and biological language of which he says, "We do not have bodies, we are our bodies. Emotional reality and biological ground are the same and cannot, in any way, be separated or distinguished."   Life incarnate is a process of individual human experience manifesting in the body. Originally published by Simon and Schuster in 1975.
 Keleman, Stanley (1974) Living Your Dying   Berkeley, CA: Center Press. . • Originally published by Random House.   Examines big dying and little dyings in relation to the shaping of our living, as well as attitudes toward dying, styles of dying, and styles of living.
 Keleman, Stanley (1971). Human Ground: Sexuality, Self and Survival . Berkeley, CA: Center Press. p. 195. .

References 

1931 births
2018 deaths
American chiropractors
Writers from Berkeley, California
People from Brooklyn
Body psychotherapy
Healthcare in the San Francisco Bay Area
American male writers
People from Berkeley, California
National University of Health Sciences alumni
American people of Hungarian-Jewish descent
American people of Romanian-Jewish descent